Somma may refer to:

Places
Somma Lombardo, an Italian municipality in the Province of Varese 
Somma Vesuviana, an Italian municipality in the Province of Naples
Sommacampagna, an Italian municipality in the Province of Verona
Massa di Somma, an Italian municipality in the Province of Naples
Mount Somma, an Italian mountain part of the Vesuvius complex

People
Antonio Somma (1809–1864), an Italian writer
Davide Somma (b. 1985), a South African soccer player
Mario Somma (b. 1963),an Italian football manager

Other
Somma volcano (or Somma), a kind of volcanic caldera
A.C. Somma, an Italian football club based in Sommacampagna

See also
Summa and Summa (disambiguation)
Somme (disambiguation)